Lan Bale (born 7 September 1969) is a former professional tennis player from South Africa. He enjoyed most of his tennis success while playing doubles. During his career, he won four doubles titles and finished runner-up an additional four times. He achieved a career-high doubles ranking of world No. 27 in 1995.

ATP career finals

Doubles: 8 (4–4)

References

External links
 
 

South African male tennis players
Living people
1969 births
Alumni of Maritzburg College